Brenthia confluxana is a moth of the family Choreutidae. It is known from Brazil, Trinidad, Cuba, Jamaica and Dominica.

The length of the forewings is 3.9–4.1 mm for males and 4-4.8 mm for females.

References

Brenthia